Philip Charles Testa (April 21, 1924 – March 15, 1981), also known as "The Chicken Man", was an Italian-American mobster known for his brief leadership of the Philadelphia crime family of the Italian-American Mafia. He became boss of the Philadelphia crime family after the previous boss and his close friend, Angelo Bruno, was murdered by Bruno’s own consigliere, Antonio Caponigro, who, in turn, was ordered killed by The Commission for murdering a boss without permission. Testa's nickname came from his involvement in a poultry business. About a year after Bruno's death, Testa was killed by the blast of a nail bomb at his home in South Philadelphia. The assassination was allegedly ordered by Testa’s own underboss, Peter Casella, as part of the first Philadelphia Mafia War.

Early life
Testa was born to Sicilian immigrants in Philadelphia, Pennsylvania, and lived in South Philadelphia with his family in his teenage years. In South Philadelphia he met and befriended future mob boss Angelo Bruno. He later married Alfia Arcidiacono (records show her family owned a farm in Salem County, New Jersey). In early police dossiers on Testa, he was identified by law enforcement as not having a legitimate source of income and was solely dependent from winnings as a "common gambler."

Testa and his wife had a son who also became involved in organized crime, Salvatore Testa, and was killed three years after his father.

In 1970, Testa became underboss of Angelo Bruno. When Bruno was murdered in 1980, Testa became boss, appointing Nicodemo Scarfo as consigliere.

Death and aftermath

One month before Testa was murdered, he, Frank Narducci Sr., Harold and Mario Riccobene, Pasquale Spirito, Joseph Ciancaglini, and several associates were indicted in a federal racketeering case that centered on gambling and loansharking operations run by the mob. The case was based on an investigation called Operation Gangplank and was one of the first built on the RICO Act by the U.S. Attorney's Office in Philadelphia. On March 15, 1981, Testa returned to his home in South Philadelphia that was across the street from Stephen Girard Park. As he was opening the door to his twin home at 2117 Porter Street, a nail bomb exploded under his front porch. His death was allegedly ordered by his underboss and drug trafficker Peter Casella and capo Frank Narducci Sr., which later resulted in Narducci being gunned down and Casella being banished from the Mob and fleeing to Florida.

Testa's murder sparked a war within the family. Nicodemo Scarfo seized the top position for himself, promoting his long time friend Chuckie Merlino as his underboss and Testa loyalist Frank Monte as his consigliere. Scarfo would go on to lead the family for a decade with a bloody rampage, fueled by paranoia and aggression.

In popular culture
Testa's violent death is referenced in the opening lines of musician Bruce Springsteen's song "Atlantic City".

See also
List of unsolved murders

References

Further reading

External links
Philip "Chickenman" Testa at Find A Grave

1924 births
1981 deaths
1981 murders in the United States
20th-century American criminals
American crime bosses
Deaths by improvised explosive device in the United States
Murdered American gangsters of Italian descent
Murdered American gangsters of Sicilian descent
People murdered by the Philadelphia crime family
Gangsters from Philadelphia
People murdered in Pennsylvania
Philadelphia crime family
Unsolved murders in the United States
Burials in Pennsylvania